Tero Leinonen (born 9 March 1975 in Mikkeli, Finland) is a retired ice hockey goaltender who was last playing with the  Iserlohn Roosters in the Deutsche Eishockey Liga.

References

External links
 

1975 births
HC Bílí Tygři Liberec players
Ilves players
JYP Jyväskylä players
Living people
Luleå HF players
Mikkelin Jukurit players
Mora IK players
Vaasan Sport players
Finnish ice hockey goaltenders
People from Mikkeli
Sportspeople from South Savo
Iserlohn Roosters players
HC Valpellice players
Linköping HC players
Tingsryds AIF players
Finnish expatriate ice hockey players in Sweden
Finnish expatriate ice hockey players in Italy
Finnish expatriate ice hockey players in Germany
Finnish expatriate ice hockey players in the Czech Republic